Villa di Serio is a comune (municipality) in the Province of Bergamo in the Italian region of Lombardy, located about  northeast of Milan and about  northeast of Bergamo.

The municipality of Villa di Serio contains the frazione (subdivision) Rinnovata.

Villa di Serio borders the following municipalities: Alzano Lombardo, Nembro, Ranica, Scanzorosciate.

Demographic evolution

References